Münnich Motorsport GmbH, which also competes under the title All-Inkl.com Racing, is an auto racing team founded by German racing driver and entrepreneur René Münnich in 2006. The team has been built around three areas of motorsport since its inception, sports car racing, rallycross and touring car racing, although in recent years it has focussed on the latter two. The team is backed by Münnich's personal business, domain registrar and web host All-Inkl.

The team currently competes in the World Touring Car Cup and the FIA World Rallycross Championship.

Rallycross

Although the team previously competed in the FIA European Championships for Rallycross Drivers, their current rallycross efforts involve the World Rallycross Championship with a SEAT Ibiza.

In February 2015 it was announced that Münnich Motorsport would be joining the FIA World Rallycross Championship with a self-developed Audi S3. In 2016 they switched to the SEAT Ibiza.

Sportscars

Münnich's sports car efforts have been at the behest of Lamborghini, previously competing in the FIA GT Championship during the 2006 and 2007 seasons with a Murciélago before switching to the German ADAC GT Masters with a Gallardo. Münnich returned to Lamborghini for 2010 by entering the new Murciélago LP670 SV in the inaugural FIA GT1 World Championship, employing experienced sports car drivers Marc Basseng, Thomas Jäger, Christophe Bouchut, Dominik Schwager, and Nicky Pastorelli.

World Touring Car Championship

SEAT León WTCC (2013)
After the demise of the FIA GT1 World Championship, Münnich Motorsport made the decision to enter the World Touring Car Championship. The team ran three cars for René Münnich, Marc Basseng and Markus Winkelhock. Winkelhock left the team in February 2013 and was replaced by defending champion Robert Huff who moved from Chevrolet. Münnich was the team's only driver eligible for the Yokohama Independent Drivers' Trophy with both Huff and Basseng being reigning champions in the WTCC at the FIA GT1 World Championship respectively.

Chevrolet RML Cruze TC1 (2014–2016)
In 2014 Münich Motorsport competed in the WTCC races using a brace of Chevrolet RML Cruze TC1 cars. Gianni Morbidelli ended 9th in the driver standings with 109 points and René Münnich ended 19th with 3 points.

Citroën C-Elysée WTCC (2017)
For what would turn out to be the final year of the WTCC the team ran a sole Citroën C-Elysée WTCC for 2012 champion Rob Huff. Despite expecting to be outright title contenders, Huff didn't win a race until the penultimate meeting of the year.

Racing record

Incomplete World Touring Car Championship results
(key) (Races in bold indicate pole position) (Races in italics indicate fastest lap)

†Did not finish the race, but was classified as he completed over 90% of the race distance.

Complete FIA World Rallycross Championship results
(key)

Supercar

† Points scored with other team(s).
* Season still in progress.

Complete FIA European Rallycross Championship results
(key)

Division 1A

Division 1

Super1600

* Season still in progress

Supercar

References

External links
 
 

German auto racing teams
Auto racing teams established in 2006
2006 establishments in Germany
FIA GT1 World Championship teams
FIA GT Championship teams
World Touring Car Championship teams
World Rallycross Championship teams
Global RallyCross Championship teams
Honda in motorsport